"The Wheel" is the thirteenth and final episode of the first season of the American television drama series Mad Men. It was written by Matthew Weiner and Robin Veith and directed by Weiner. The episode originally aired on AMC in the United States on October 18, 2007.

Plot 
The episode starts with Pete talking to his father-in-law Tom who is talking to him about work and business. It then cuts to Betty talking about Thanksgiving plans and going to see her family. She wants Don to come, but he makes up excuses such as having a lot of work to do. Meanwhile, Harry has been kicked out of the house. He begs his wife to come home, but she is stern with her answer as no.

The next day Betty comes home and finds Francine crying. She suspects her husband Carlton is cheating on her. She tells Betty that she saw a lot of long-distance calls to the city, and she called the number back and a woman answered. He also sleeps in the city two nights a week. All of this led her to believe he is cheating on her. Betty comforts and listens to her as she says she wishes she could poison him. When Don gets home Betty tells him about the suspected affair and asks how people could do something like this. Don reassures her and tells her not to worry.

Meanwhile, Peggy and Ken are auditioning women to be the voice-over for Relax-a-Cizor. Peggy is more interested in Annie, while Ken is more interested in Rita. Annie reads off her lines and Peggy keeps interrupting her because she doesn't like how she sounds. Peggy interrupts her again and tells her to speak with more confidence. Annie eventually gets overwhelmed and starts to cry. Peggy then fires her, and they make plans to hire Rita.

Don sits in his office, trying to think of ideas for Kodak's new projector, dubbed the "Wheel", and he starts to reminisce on a picture of him and his brother Adam. Don then goes to call him and is informed by his landlord that Adam hanged himself. Don is very hurt by this.

Betty, getting inspiration from Francine, sees that on their phone bill there are a bunch of calls to Manhattan; she calls and hears that it’s her psychiatrist. She then feels betrayed and starts to get upset. She sees Glen and asks him to tell her that she’ll be okay. Glen says he doesn't know and that he wishes he was older. Later Betty goes to see her psychiatrist and she speaks about how much it has helped her and how she has her doubts about Don and him being faithful. She also expresses that she wishes her family can be together for Thanksgiving. 

Don has a meeting with Kodak and he shows his advertisement renaming the product the "Carousel" and it gets very emotional and nostalgic as he shows pictures of his family, from his kids and their special moments to his wedding and throughout Betty’s pregnancy. His pitch is very moving to everybody. Kodak is very impressed and cancels their upcoming meetings with other agencies. After Don wins over Kodak, he makes Peggy a junior copywriter, and she gets a shared office. People have issues with this because she has been a secretary, but Don feels otherwise. During all this excitement Peggy becomes very sick and goes to the hospital as a result of a cryptic pregnancy. She gives birth to a boy and when offered the baby, refuses to even acknowledge it. 

On the way back home, Don imagines coming home in time to see Betty and the kids and tell them that he is coming with them for Thanksgiving. However, his house is empty and the episode ends with Don looking very lost and empty.

Reception 
In its original broadcast, the episode received 930,000 viewers.

Andrew Johnston wrote for Slant Magazine that he liked how the series brought Glen Bishop back to have a scene with Betty. In the scenes with Glen and Betty, we see Betty completely candid, a side of Betty we do not get to see with Don. He goes on to point out that Betty’s conversation with Glen identifies the bigger issue, that Betty no longer has anyone she can be totally honest with since she found out that Don has been talking to her therapist.

Noel Murray writes for The A.V. Club that his favorite scene from the season was Don’s pitch of "The Carousel" to Kodak.  Don’s pitch focuses around how even though advertising is fairly new, it uses nostalgia to sell products. Murray connects this idea to the premise of the show. He writes that “It's at once a classic TV drama with a sense of retro style and a sophisticated one in look and tone, on the cutting edge of elliptical television storytelling in the same manner as The Sopranos and The Wire”.

Accolades 
Matthew Weiner and Robin Veith received a nomination for Outstanding Writing in a Drama Series at the 60th Primetime Emmy Awards.

References

External links 
 

Mad Men (season 1) episodes
2007 American television episodes